David Arthur Duffield (born 21 September 1940) is an American billionaire businessman in the software industry.  He is the co-founder and former chairman of PeopleSoft, co-founder and chairman emeritus of Workday, Inc., and current founder and CEO of Ridgeline, Inc. He has been on the Forbes World's Richest People list for many years.

David Duffield cofounded two publicly traded enterprise software companies after age 40: PeopleSoft and Workday. He has given $345 million to Maddie’s Fund and another $400 million to, among others, his alma mater Cornell, as of June 2019. His current philanthropy interests are managed by the Dave & Cheryl Duffield Foundation. Their capstone project is Liberty Dogs, a service dog training campus in Reno, Nevada, that will match and train service veterans and canine companions. This facility is planned to open in 2026.

Early life
Duffield attended Ridgewood High School in Ridgewood, New Jersey. He graduated with the class of 1958 and was co-captain of the Ridgewood High School baseball team. Duffield received a bachelor's degree in electrical engineering and an MBA from Cornell University, and is the benefactor behind Duffield Hall, a nanoscale science (or nanotechnology) and engineering facility at Cornell. While at Cornell, Duffield was a member of Beta Theta Pi.

Career
In 1964, Duffield began his career as a marketing representative and systems engineer at IBM. He left IBM to found Information Associates, which developed university exam scheduling software. In 1972, he left to start Integral Systems, which eventually became the top higher education Human Resource Management System vendor. In 1979, he moved on to start Business Software Corporation, which provided real-time human resources and payroll applications for commercial enterprises.

PeopleSoft
Duffield founded PeopleSoft in 1987 and served as the company's CEO and board chairman. PeopleSoft grew to be the world's second-largest application software company before being acquired by Oracle in January 2005 for $10.7 billion cash.

Workday
In March 2005, Duffield and former PeopleSoft vice chair and head of product strategy Aneel Bhusri started Workday, Inc., a company that provides financial management, human capital management, and planning software delivered in the form of a software as a service (SaaS) model. The company is headquartered in Pleasanton, California, and employed 15,200 people at the start of 2022. Duffield was known as the company's chief customer and employee advocate. He relinquished the co-CEO role in May 2014 and became chairman of the board. He resigned as chairman in April 2021 and was appointed chairman emeritus by Workday’s board.

Ridgeline 
Duffield founded his current company, Ridgeline, in 2017. Headquartered in Incline Village, Nevada, Ridgeline is a unified cloud software platform for investment management. The early-stage company currently employs approximately 350 people in offices in Incline Village, Reno, New York City, and San Ramon, California.

Maddie's Fund 
In 1994, Duffield and his wife Cheryl established Maddie's Fund, originally named the Duffield Family Foundation, renamed in 1999. The organization is named after the Duffields’ Miniature Schnauzer who was a "lighthouse during the stormy period" of the couple's work careers. Maddie died of cancer in 1997, and Duffield acted on his earlier promise to his pet: "If we ever make some money, I promise we will give it back to you and your kind so others can be as happy as we are today."

The Duffields endowed Maddie's Fund with more than $300 million, which has spent in excess of $265 million through FY2021-22 for animal welfare.

Dave & Cheryl Duffield Foundation 
The Duffields established the Dave & Cheryl Duffield Foundation in 2016 to continue innovative grant making in animal welfare, support for military veterans, and education. Based in Incline Village, Nevada, the foundation has supported animal welfare agencies, pet shelters, and regional community organizations including the area Boys and Girls Club and local parks. In April 2020, the Duffield Foundation made a $350,000 grant to Incline Village Community Hospital to address the COVID-19 pandemic. In response to the 2021 Lake Tahoe forest fires, the foundation donated $4 million to over 30 charities, including $2 million to the Red Cross.

Liberty Dogs 
The Dave & Cheryl Duffield Foundation is currently financing the construction and development of Liberty Dogs in Reno, Nevada. This campus is planned to open in 2026. The goal is to provide veterans with the ability to lead more independent and fulfilling lives through the enhanced emotional and psychological well-being that research shows a Liberty Service Dog provides.

Cornell University 
The Duffields donated $20 million in January 1997 to Cornell University in support of interdisciplinary engineering and scientific research and education. The new Engineering building was later renamed “Duffield Hall.” 

In July 2020, the Duffields donated $5 million to establish the Duffield Family Cornell Promise Scholarship. The gift was the largest single gift to the Cornell Promise Initiative, which provides financial support to students and families facing hardship from the pandemic.

In early 2022, the Duffields also donated $12.1 million to launch the new Duffield Institute for Animal Behavior at the Cornell University College of Veterinary Medicine.

Awards
1998 Golden Plate Award of the American Academy of Achievement

2013 EY Entrepreneur of the Year Award Recipient

2018 Cornell Engineering Distinguished Alumni Award – its highest alumni honor

Personal life
David Duffield is married to Cheryl Duffield. Between 2005 and 2016 they lived in Alamo, California but now live near Lake Tahoe.

References

External links
 Workday website
 Maddie's fund website

1941 births
Living people
Samuel Curtis Johnson Graduate School of Management alumni
People from Ho-Ho-Kus, New Jersey
American billionaires
American technology chief executives
Cornell University College of Engineering alumni
People from Alamo, California
American technology company founders